This is a list of cases reported in volume 41 (16 Pet.) of United States Reports, decided by the Supreme Court of the United States in 1842.

Nominative reports 
In 1874, the U.S. government created the United States Reports, and retroactively numbered older privately-published case reports as part of the new series.  As a result, cases appearing in volumes 1–90 of U.S. Reports have dual citation forms; one for the volume number of U.S. Reports, and one for the volume number of the reports named for the relevant reporter of decisions (these are called "nominative reports").

Richard Peters, Jr. 
Starting with the 26th volume of U.S. Reports, the Reporter of Decisions of the Supreme Court of the United States was Richard Peters, Jr. Peters was Reporter of Decisions from 1828 to 1843, covering volumes 26 through 41 of United States Reports which correspond to volumes 1 through 16 of his Peters's Reports. As such, the dual form of citation to, for example, Nixdorff v. Smith is 41 U.S. (16 Pet.) 132 (1842).

Justices of the Supreme Court at the time of 41 U.S. (16 Pet.) 

The Supreme Court is established by Article III, Section 1 of the Constitution of the United States, which says: "The judicial Power of the United States, shall be vested in one supreme Court . . .". The size of the Court is not specified; the Constitution leaves it to Congress to set the number of justices. Under the Judiciary Act of 1789 Congress originally fixed the number of justices at six (one chief justice and five associate justices). Since 1789 Congress has varied the size of the Court from six to seven, nine, ten, and back to nine justices (always including one chief justice).

When the cases in 41 U.S. (16 Pet.) were decided the Court comprised these nine justices:

Notable Cases in 41 U.S. (16 Pet.)

Swift v. Tyson 
In Swift v. Tyson, 41 U.S. (16 Pet.) 1 (1842), the US Supreme Court determined that United States federal courts hearing diversity jurisdiction cases under the Judiciary Act of 1789 must apply statutory state laws when the state legislature in question had spoken on the relevant issue, but need not apply the a state's common law if the state's legislature had not spoken on the issue. The decision meant that the federal courts deciding matters not specifically addressed by a state legislature had the authority to develop a federal common law.

Prigg v. Pennsylvania 
In Prigg v. Pennsylvania, 41 U.S. (16 Pet.) 539 (1842), the US Supreme Court held that the federal Fugitive Slave Act of 1793 pre-empted a state law that made it a crime to take blacks out of the free state of Pennsylvania and into slavery elsewhere. Also, by refusing to take judicial notice of the problem of free blacks being kidnapped in free states and sold into slavery, Prigg implied that blacks were entitled to fewer procedural protections than were whites.

Citation style 

Under the Judiciary Act of 1789 the federal court structure at the time comprised District Courts, which had general trial jurisdiction; Circuit Courts, which had mixed trial and appellate (from the US District Courts) jurisdiction; and the United States Supreme Court, which had appellate jurisdiction over the federal District and Circuit courts—and for certain issues over state courts. The Supreme Court also had limited original jurisdiction (i.e., in which cases could be filed directly with the Supreme Court without first having been heard by a lower federal or state court). There were one or more federal District Courts and/or Circuit Courts in each state, territory, or other geographical region.

Bluebook citation style is used for case names, citations, and jurisdictions.  
 e.g.,"C.C.D.N.J." = United States Circuit Court for the District of New Jersey
 e.g.,"D. Mass." = United States District Court for the District of Massachusetts 
 "E." = Eastern; "M." = Middle; "N." = Northern; "S." = Southern; "W." = Western
 e.g.,"C.C.S.D.N.Y." = United States Circuit Court for the Southern District of New York
 e.g.,"M.D. Ala." = United States District Court for the Middle District of Alabama
 "Ct. Cl." = United States Court of Claims
 The abbreviation of a state's name alone indicates the highest appellate court in that state's judiciary at the time. 
 e.g.,"Pa." = Supreme Court of Pennsylvania
 e.g.,"Me." = Supreme Judicial Court of Maine

List of cases in 41 U.S. (16 Pet.)

Notes and references

See also
 Certificate of division

External links
  Case reports in volume 41 (16 Pet.) from Library of Congress
  Case reports in volume 41 (16 Pet.) from Court Listener
  Case reports in volume 41 (16 Pet.) from the Caselaw Access Project of Harvard Law School
  Case reports in volume 41 (16 Pet.) from Google Scholar
  Case reports in volume 41 (16 Pet.) from Justia
  Case reports in volume 41 (16 Pet.) from Open Jurist
 Website of the United States Supreme Court
 United States Courts website about the Supreme Court
 National Archives, Records of the Supreme Court of the United States
 American Bar Association, How Does the Supreme Court Work?
 The Supreme Court Historical Society

1842 in United States case law